Camping is a web application  microframework written in Ruby. Camping's source code is less than 4 KB in size.

It was created and updated by the programmer known as "Why the lucky stiff" until version 1.5. Around that time Why's focus shifted towards Hackety Hack and related project Shoes. Why provided Judofyr (a major contributor) with admin access on rubyforge.org and other sites. Judofyr took over as de facto head of the project. Since then Camping has been a community driven framework with contributions from many people and a small but helpful community. While Judofyr is sometimes seen as a leader, he's insisted camping be governed by consensus on the (now defunct) mailing list. Why's eventual departure solidified the project as being communally run, and is notable for being one of the few former Why projects to be taken over by the community before Why's disappearance. Current editions of Camping are available from GitHub and are distributed as a RubyGem.

Overview
Camping stores a complete fledgling web application in a single file, like a bundle of many small CGI scripts, but organizes it as a model–view–controller application as Ruby on Rails does.  Camping applications can stand alone, meet niche requirements as 'the small wheels' that serve larger setups, or easily be ported to Rails.

Installation
For a basic installation, Camping only requires Rack (0.3 or higher) and (if you want to write HTML) Markaby (0.5 or higher), both available as Rubygems. Further details can be found on the Camping wiki. To use a database (SQLite by default) you'll also need the ActiveRecord and Sqlite3-ruby Rubygems. Run camping yourappname.rb to launch the application on port 3301.

Tutorials
The introductory tutorial builds a minimal unstyled wiki (download working example wiki code), and the Camping examples contains a tiny but fully functioning css-styled blog. Earlier Camping 1.5 examples will either run without modification or require only slight adjustments to run under Camping 2.0.

See also

 Hackety Hack

References

External links
 Camping 2.0.* on GitHub
 Camping wiki on GitHub
 Camping mailing list: messages by thread
 Why Camping Matters by Nathaniel Talbott at rubyconf 2007
 
 
 Wild and Crazy Metaprogramming with Camping
 Why's poignant guide to Ruby 

Web frameworks
Free computer libraries
Free software programmed in Ruby
Software using the MIT license